Who Killed Atlanta's Children? (also known as Echo of Murder and Unanswered Questions) is a TV movie about the Atlanta child murders starring James Belushi and Gregory Hines. It was directed by Charles Robert Carner and first aired on Showtime on July 16, 2000. This movie projects a conspiracy theory about the murders: that they were committed by the Ku Klux Klan, who then framed Wayne Williams.

Reception
The movie was critically reviewed in Time magazine by Richard Corliss, who said the director-writer "blithely shuffles fact and innuendo."

Cast
 James Belushi - Pat Laughlin
 Gregory Hines - Ron Larson
 Sean McCann - Aubrey Melton
 Shawn Doyle - Royle McCullough
 Kenneth Welsh - William Kunstler
 Eugene Clark - Dave
 Jack Wallace - Phil Peters
 J. J. Johnston - Clark Hildebrandt
 Aidan Devine - Jack Johnson
 Lynda Gravatt - Mildred Glover
 Debra Sharkey - Sally Laughlin
 Bill Duke - Chirumenga Jeng
 Bill MacDonald - B.J. the informant
 Craig Eldridge - Robert Ingram, GBI
 Matthew Cooke - Lubie Geter
 Karen Glave - Camille Bell
 Karen Robinson - Lois Evans
 Quancetia Hamilton - Willie Mae Mathis
 Sean Bell - Daryl McCullough
Michael Rhoades - Bobby McCullough
 Cle Bennett - Wayne Williams
 Sarah Lafleur - Spin Secretary
 Philip Akin - Police Spokesman
 Bill Lake - GBI Man
 Patrick Chilvers - FBI Agent
 Conrad Coates - Special Agent

References 

American television films
Films about conspiracy theories
American films based on actual events
2000 television films
2000 films
Films directed by Charles Robert Carner